This is an overview of the progression of the Olympic track cycling record of the women's 3000 m individual pursuit, as recognised by the Union Cycliste Internationale (UCI).

The women's 3000m individual pursuit was introduced at the 1992 Summer Olympics and was discontinued after the 2008 Summer Olympics.

Progression

References

Track cycling Olympic record progressions